The LORAN-C transmitter Rantum is a transmission facility for LORAN-C on the German island Sylt near the village Rantum at . It was established in the 1960s, initially using a guyed steel framework mast with a triangular cross section, approximately 190 metres tall. In 1996 this mast was replaced by a 193-metre-high mast of the same type but of a better mechanical design. The new mast  is, as its forerunner, insulated from ground and has a triangular cross section. The transmitter was shut down on Dec 31, 2015.

External links
 
 http://www.skyscraperpage.com/diagrams/?b45904

See also
 List of masts

LORAN-C transmitters
Radio masts and towers in Germany
1960s establishments in Germany